Narsakkapalli is a village in Parkal mandal of Hanamkonda district in Telangana state, India.

References

Villages in Hanamkonda district